Samuel F. "Sam" Vigil Jr. (November 20, 1929 – December 7, 2019) was an American politician who served as member of the New Mexico House of Representatives for the 70th district from 1970 to 1998.

Life and career 
Vigil was the son of Maclovia Lujan and Samuel Vigil Sr. He attended New Mexico Highlands University.

Vigil served in the United States Army as a medic during the Korean War. After being discharged, he served in the New Mexico National Guard.

In 1970, Vigil was elected to represent the 70th district of the New Mexico House of Representatives. He served until 1998 and was succeeded by Richard Vigil. During his tenure in the house, he served as chair of the Educational Committee.

Vigil established Luna Community College and served as its president until 1999. He  was appointed to the President's Commission of Excellence of Education for Hispanic American Students by President Bill Clinton.

Vigil died in December 2019 of natural causes, at the age of 90. He was buried in Santa Fe National Cemetery.

References 

1929 births
2019 deaths
Democratic Party members of the New Mexico House of Representatives
20th-century American politicians
New Mexico Highlands University alumni
Burials at Santa Fe National Cemetery